Bloordale Beach was a guerrilla art installation and an informal community hub in the west end of Toronto, and since it was landlocked, was once described as "Toronto's only waterless beach".

Bloordale Beach was located north of the Dufferin Mall between Croatia Street and Brock Crescent, on a site that previously used to be Brockton High School. It covered 118,400 square-feet. The beach was located on property owned by the Toronto District School Board.

The beach closed in 2021 to make way for the new Bloor Collegiate Institute.

Usage 
Bloordale Beach was co-created by artist Shari Kasman and an anonymous collaborator in order to reclaim unused space for the public, and opened 25 May 2020.

Public facilities included a dog gymnasium (officially called the Barkour Area), a "sea turtle nesting area," Bloordale Lagoon (essentially a large puddle that would form after heavy rainfall, a community garden, and occasional temporary art installations. Bloordale Meadow was located on the neighbouring lot, and had been previously known as the field for Bloor Collegiate Institute.

Bloordale Beach was used as a community hub and a throughway to cut across the space.

Toronto garage punk psych rock band Wine Lips recorded a their music video Live At Bloordale Beach at the beach. It was also the set for an improv performance by Martin Helmut Reis that was filmed an debuted at the 2020 Improvisation Festival and Martin Reis' performance art American Lifeguard.

Critical reception 
Bloordale Beach was described in The Toronto Star as Toronto's "newest hot summer destination" and was ranked as the 9th best beach in Toronto on Tripadvisor.

In popular culture 
Bloordale Beach was featured in the short documentary Bloordale Beach by Beth Warrian where it was described as a vision for reclaiming public space.

The beach was the subject of the 2021 song "Bloordale Beach" by garage punk-pop band Pop Plug, and the 2021 song also called "Bloordale Beach" by Catjam. Pete Moss also made a song called “Bloordale Beach.”

AUS!Funkt, Canadian art-rock band, paid homage to the beach in the video for their song "Set Yourself Free".

Footnotes

References

External links 

 Tripadvisor - Bloordale Beach
 Shari Kasman official website

Guerilla art and hacking art
Works by Canadian people
Culture jamming
Street art